Vikhlyantsevsky is a rural locality (a khutor) in Bespalovskoye Rural Settlement, Uryupinsky District, Volgograd Oblast, Russia. The population was 174 as of 2010. There are 4 streets.

Geography 
Vikhlyantsevsky is located 44 km northwest of Uryupinsk (the district's administrative centre) by road. Astakhovsky is the nearest rural locality.

References 

Rural localities in Uryupinsky District